Danny Mills is a professional rugby league footballer who played for the Batley Bulldogs.

He formerly played for Huddersfield, Doncaster, Widnes and Sheffield Eagles.

References

Year of birth missing (living people)
Living people
Batley Bulldogs players
Doncaster R.L.F.C. players
Huddersfield Giants players
Rugby league centres
Sheffield Eagles players
West Indies national rugby league team players
Widnes Vikings players